Kenneth Lee Ryskamp (August 10, 1932 – November 16, 2017) was a United States district judge of the United States District Court for the Southern District of Florida.

Education and career

Born in Grand Rapids, Michigan, Ryskamp received an Artium Baccalaureus degree from Calvin College in 1955. He received a Juris Doctor from University of Miami School of Law in 1956. He was a law clerk for Judge Mallory H. Horton of the Florida Third District Court of Appeal from 1957 to 1959. He was in private practice of law in Miami, Florida from 1959 to 1986.

Federal judicial service

Ryskamp was nominated by President Ronald Reagan on March 12, 1986, to a seat on the United States District Court for the Southern District of Florida vacated by Judge Joe Oscar Eaton. He was confirmed by the United States Senate on April 23, 1986, and received commission on April 24, 1986. He took the judicial oath and commenced service on May 2, 1986. He assumed senior status on January 1, 2000. As of January 2017, Ryskamp took inactive senior status, meaning that while he remained a federal judge, he no longer heard cases or participated in the business of the court. Ryskamp died on November 16, 2017.

Failed nomination to the Eleventh Circuit 

On April 26, 1990, Ryskamp was nominated to a seat on the United States Court of Appeals for the Eleventh Circuit by President George H. W. Bush to replace Judge Paul Roney, who had taken senior status.  The Democratic-controlled United States Senate Judiciary Committee chose not to proceed with Ryskamp's nomination, in part because of his membership in a private country club, the Riviera Country Club in Coral Gables, Florida, that was said to be discriminatory. Some senators also objected to comments by Ryskamp during a 1987 case that they considered to be insensitive. After the November 1990 elections, Bush renominated Ryskamp to the seat on January 8, 1991, but Ryskamp's nomination continued to be held up in committee by Senate Democrats, and it eventually was defeated in the Senate Judiciary Committee by an 8–6, party-line vote on April 12, 1991. As a result, his nomination never made it to the Senate floor for a full Senate vote.

See also 
George H. W. Bush judicial appointment controversies

References

Sources 
 

1932 births
2017 deaths
American Presbyterians
Calvin University alumni
Florida lawyers
Judges of the United States District Court for the Southern District of Florida
People from Grand Rapids, Michigan
United States district court judges appointed by Ronald Reagan
20th-century American judges
20th-century American lawyers